Pitampura is a residential area in North West Delhi district of Delhi, India. It is located adjacent to Rohini. Pitampura is an upscale and affluent locality, in the North West Delhi district of Delhi, India. Property rates of Pitampura are highest among its neighborhoods due to lush greenery and better access to markets . It is a planned neighbourhood developed by the Delhi Development Authority in the 1980s and Pitampura TV Tower, was built in 1988. Dilli Haat Pitampura is also situated near the TV tower.
Situated West -part of Delhi, it is an upscale residential, commercial and retail centre. The area is encompassed between Outer and Inner Ring Roads, NH-1 and Rohtak Road. It has two wards, Pitampura and Pitampura North, under the Rohini zone of Municipal Corporation of Delhi.

It is serviced by the Pitampura metro station, Kohat Enclave, and Netaji Subhash Place metro station of Delhi Metro's Red Line.

Overview
It is home to many government servants from central administrative services. This locality got its name from the "Pitampura Village" located near Madhuban Chowk, this village's history is around 400–500 years old. It was developed by the Delhi Development Authority in 1980s.

Pitampura also has plotted houses developed by the Delhi Development Authority. It also has co-operative housing societies like Vaishali Enclave, Maurya Enclave, Saraswati Vihar, Lok Vihar, Kohat Enclave, Kapil Vihar, Deepali Enclave, Pushpanjali Enclave, Tarun Enclave, Vasudha Enclave, Rajdhani Enclave, Chanderlok Enclave, Sainik Vihar, Vishakha Enclave, Maurya Enclave, West Enclave, etc. In addition, there are plenty of flatted societies like Rajasthali Apartments, Mandakini Apartments, Madhuban Apartments, Income Tax Colony, Ashiana, Xavier Apartments, Vidya Vihar.

Delhi's second Dilli Haat, a traditional food and crafts bazaar, was developed by Delhi Tourism and Transportation Development Corporation in Pitampura, close to Pitampura TV Tower and spread over 7.2 hectares, started in 2003, and opened in April 2008.
Delhi Development Authority has developed a new HIG Housing Complex near TV Tower, as a part of its Delhi Development Authority Housing Scheme – 2008.

Pitampura also attracts people from all over Delhi for shopping due to many high-class brands present and the presence of Netaji Subhash Place, Pitampura, a place to hang out. It is also a hub to many jewelry shops like Tanishq, Malabar Gold and Diamonds, Kalyan jewelers, PC Jewelers, etc.

Attractions
The various major attractions of the region are
 Dilli Haat Pitampura
 Pacific Mall NSP
 Sita Ram Diwan Chand ( Paharganj)
 Kuremal Kulfi ( Chandni Chowk)
 Sita Ram Pethe Wala ( Khari Baoli)
 Bansal Sweets
 Gulab Sweets
 Orana Platum Banquet Hall NSP
 Pitampura TV Tower
 District Park
 Pitampura Club
 Netaji Subhash Place
 Hotel City Park
 Fun Cinemas (now Cinepolis)
 Max Hospital
 Premsay Bakers (JD Market)
 Samosa Junction
 Shake Eat Up
 Velocity Fitness Clinic
 Sai Baba Mandir
 Kali Mata Mandir
 Pitampura village
 Gopal Mandir
 Malabar Gold and Diamonds
 Movie Time Pitampura
 Kalyan Jewelers
 Barbeque-Nation

Education

Several schools, colleges and vocational training institutes are growing in number here. A few of these are:

 Sri Guru Gobind Singh College of Commerce
 Delhi School of Business (VIPS Technical Campus)
 Management Studies:Magnum Opus School of Business Studies, Netaji Subhash Place
 Jagannath Institute of Management Studies 
 Schools: Sachdeva Public School, Maharaja Agrasen Model School, St.Stephens School Pitampura, Kendriya Vidyalaya TP Block Pitampura, Ravindra Public School, D.A.V. Public School, Pushpanjali Enclave, Apeejay School, Maxfort School, Bal Bharati Public School, Pitampura, S.D. Public School, Darbari Lal DAV Model School, Guru Nanak Public School, KIIT World School, Abhinav Public School, VMC, FIITJEE, Career Launcher, Aakash Institute, Clat Possible and many more.

Shopping and entertainment
With the advent of shopping malls and retail outlets of world-renowned brands and designer labels, like Gold Souk, Pacific Mall, M2K Cinemas, PVR Cinemas, Fun Republic, Pitampura has developed really well, resulting in a skyrocketing of the real estate prices in the area. Pitampura also has some High-Class hotels like "Hotel City Park" and even otherwise. Also, Netaji Subash Place, which is a hangout hub for Delhiites comes under Pitampura. There is a local market in Pitampura which is called Rani Bagh market where people generally shop for fresh produce of fruits and vegetables, along with clothes and things needed at home, like utensils. It is a crowded place but the goods are really affordable.

Dilli Haat (Pitampura)

Dilli Haat at Pitampura, north-west Delhi, near the TV Tower, is the second of its kind project of Delhi Tourism and Transport Development Corporation. The success of the Dilli Haat at the INA market encouraged the DITDC to open another, bigger, and better Dilli Haat, at Pitampura.

The Pitampura Haat, like its progenitor at the INA market, will showcase tribal art and craft, culture, cuisine, music, as well as the essence of street culture. The gateway to the Haat will serve as a street plaza. Vendors selling everything from paper toys and balloons to popcorn will get space on the walkway, giving a feel of Delhi's street culture.

There is to be a spice court that will allow shoppers to pick up authentic spices. Right next to it is the art court comprising an exhibition and art gallery space. The craft shops have been organized in two blocks along a central axis. At the rear of the Haat there is an amphitheater and food court, but to reach the food court you will have to walk through the craft stores. It is a clever way of attracting people to buy as these food stalls attract the maximum crowd.

Accessibility
As many as three Delhi Metro Stations - Netaji Subhash Place, Kohat Enclave and Pitampura, cover this locality.

It is very close to Rohini, Rani Bagh, Model Town, Shalimar Bagh, Punjabi Bagh, Ashok Vihar, Lawrence Road areas. Pitampura has many housing colonies like SD-Tower Apartments (known for the largest Super HIG flats by the Delhi Development Authority and also for its nearness to Netaji Subhash district center and TV Tower), Vaishali, Saraswati Vihar (the largest colony of Pitampura), Lok Vihar, Ajay Apartments, Apna Ghar Society, Bank Vihar, I.D.P.L. Colony, Kohat Enclave, Rohit Kunj, Sandesh Vihar, Jhulelal Apartments, Engineer's Enclave, Harsh Vihar, Kapil Vihar, Vishakha Enclave, Maurya Enclave, etc. These societies have various facilities like community centers, central parks, and parking lots.

References

External links
 Pitampura at Google Maps
 Pitampura Metro Station at wikimapia
 Dilli Haat Pitampura at Delhi Tourism

Neighbourhoods in Delhi
North West Delhi district